Großefehn (East Frisian Low Saxon: Grō'fēn) is a municipality consisting of 14 villages in the district of Aurich, in Lower Saxony, Germany. It is situated approximately 10 km southeast of Aurich.

References

Towns and villages in East Frisia
Aurich (district)